Teniorhinus herilus, the Herilus orange or Herilus skipper, is a butterfly in the family Hesperiidae. It is found along the coast of Kenya and in southern and eastern Tanzania, Malawi, Zambia, Mozambique and Zimbabwe. The habitat consists of lowland forests and heavy woodland.

Adults are attracted to flowers. They are on wing in March and April.

References

Butterflies described in 1855
Erionotini